Nathalie Santer-Bjørndalen (born 28 March 1972) is a biathlete and cross-country skier. She has dual Italian and Belgian citizenship.

From 2006 to 2012 she was married to fellow biathlete Ole Einar Bjørndalen.

Further notable results

Biathlon 
 1990:
 1st, Italian championships of biathlon
 1st, Italian championships of biathlon, sprint
 1991:
 2nd, Italian championships of biathlon
 2nd, Italian championships of biathlon, sprint
 1992: 1st, Italian championships of biathlon, sprint
 1993:
 1st, Italian championships of biathlon
 1st, Italian championships of biathlon, sprint
 1994:
 1st, Italian championships of biathlon
 1st, Italian championships of biathlon, sprint
 1995:
 1st, Italian championships of biathlon
 1st, Italian championships of biathlon, sprint
 1996:
 1st, Italian championships of biathlon
 1st, Italian championships of biathlon, sprint
 1997:
 1st, Italian championships of biathlon, sprint
 2nd, Italian championships of biathlon
 1998:
 1st, Italian championships of biathlon
 2nd, Italian championships of biathlon, pursuit
 1999: 1st, Italian championships of biathlon, sprint
 2001:
 2nd, Italian championships of biathlon, sprint
 2nd, Italian championships of biathlon, pursuit
 3rd Italian championships of biathlon
 3rd, Italian championships of biathlon, mass start
 2002:
 1st, Italian championships of biathlon
 2nd, Italian championships of biathlon, pursuit
 2nd, Italian championships of biathlon, mass start
 2003:
 3rd, Italian championships of biathlon, sprint
 3rd, Italian championships of biathlon, pursuit
 2004:
 2nd, Italian championships of biathlon, pursuit
 3rd, Italian championships of biathlon, sprint
 2005:
 2nd, Italian championships of biathlon, pursuit
 3rd, Italian championships of biathlon, sprint
 2006:
 1st, Italian championships of biathlon, sprint
 2nd, Italian championships of biathlon, pursuit

Cross-country skiing results
All results are sourced from the International Ski Federation (FIS).

World Championships

World Cup

Season standings

References

 
 

1972 births
Living people
Italian female biathletes
Belgian female biathletes
Italian female cross-country skiers
Biathletes at the 1992 Winter Olympics
Biathletes at the 1994 Winter Olympics
Biathletes at the 1998 Winter Olympics
Biathletes at the 2002 Winter Olympics
Biathletes at the 2006 Winter Olympics
Olympic biathletes of Italy
People from Innichen
Belgian female cross-country skiers
Sportspeople from Südtirol